Uttrang Kaur Khalsa (born Alexandra Penelope Aitken; 14 March 1980), also known earlier as Ally or Ale Aitken and still known as Alexandra Aitken, is a British model, actress and socialite. She has worked with some of Europe's leading fashion and art photographers such as Bob Carlos Clarke and Terry O'Neill. Aitken is a yoga teacher, and translates Sikh and Hindu scriptures.

Early and personal life 
Alexandra Aitken was born on 14 March 1980. Upon Aitken's birth in Lausanne, Switzerland, US President Richard Nixon sent flowers to her mother Lolitza. His security team and the Swiss police used the delivery to practice the emergency protocol for escorting an injured Head of State to the hospital, closing roads for the delivery.

She is the daughter of former Conservative Member of Parliament in the United Kingdom and former British government Cabinet minister Jonathan Aitken and his first wife Lolicia Aitken. She has a twin sister Victoria, a brother William, and a half-sister Petrina Khashoggi. Alexandra attended The King's School, Canterbury, where she acted as a server and school sacristan in Canterbury Cathedral, carrying altar candles. At school she was captain of the netball and hockey teams. Alexandra was on the school athletics team and won medals for sprinting and set Kent records for hurdles. Aitken graduated in fine arts and won the school art prize. She attended The Hampshire School in England and also a school in France which is (at its foundation) a ballet school. The Aitken family were political hosts, frequently hosting prayer breakfasts and political think-tank parties at their home in London.

After Aitken's father was sent to prison for perjury and perverting the course of justice, he was declared bankrupt and her mother and sister left the country.

She is the daughter of former British government Cabinet minister Jonathan Aitken, who became The Reverend Jonathan Aitken and Prison Chaplain. Alexandra is the grand-daughter of Penelope, Lady Aitken and Sir William Aitken. Alexandra is the great grand-daughter of John Maffey, 1st Baron Rugby, and the great-great niece of newspaper magnate and war-time minister Max Aitken, 1st Baron Beaverbrook. Alexandra is the cousin of super model Jodie Kidd and the niece of the actress and director Maria Aitken. Nigel Davenport best known as the Duke of Norfolk and Lord Birkenhead in the Academy Award-winning films A Man for All Seasons and Chariots of Fire is her uncle.

In 2011, she 'married' Inderjot Singh, a Sikh warrior she met while travelling in India. She now resides near Canterbury. She is a lacto-vegetarian and practising Sikh, although she has been seen recently in Canterbury Catherdral choir stalls where she has sat regularly since a being a young girl.

Career 

Aitken started her modelling career at IMG models who she joined during her first year at art college in London. She worked with fashion and art photographers Bob Carlos Clarke and Terry O'Neill (photographer). She later moved to Storm Management, where she appeared on covers. Alexandra Aitken posed in a white T-shirt and white pants for GQ magazine photographed by Willy Camden. GQ called her 'A Rock and Roll Giraffe.'

In 2004, she appeared in the movie Enduring Love. and she had two lines in the 2007 film Atonement.

Aitken remained in London and became part of a charitable 'it girl' set alongside Lady Victoria Hervey and Tara Palmer-Tomkinson.

References

Notes 

1980 births
Aitken family
Living people
People from Lausanne
British expatriates in India
British female models
British socialites
Converts to Sikhism
British yoga teachers
People educated at The King's School, Canterbury
British people of Canadian descent
British people of Swiss descent